The 2013–14 Northwestern Wildcats men's basketball team represented Northwestern University in the 2013–14 college basketball season. Led by first year head coach Chris Collins. The Wildcats were members of the Big Ten Conference and played their home games at Welsh-Ryan Arena. They finished the season 14–19, 6–12 in Big Ten play to finish in a tie for tenth place. They advanced to the quarterfinals of the Big Ten tournament where they lost to Michigan State.

Departures

Incoming recruits

Roster

}

Schedule and results
Source

|-
!colspan=9 style="background:#431F81; color:#FFFFFF;"| Exhibition

|-
!colspan=9 style="background:#431F81; color:#FFFFFF;"| Non-conference regular season

|-
!colspan=9 style="background:#431F81; color:#FFFFFF;"| Big Ten regular season

|-
!colspan=9 style="background:#431F81; color:#FFFFFF;"| Big Ten tournament

References

Northwestern Wildcats
Northwestern Wildcats men's basketball seasons
Northwestern Wild
Northwestern Wild